Oscar Enrique Herrera Hernández (3 January 1959 – 5 October 2015) was a Chilean footballer who played as a midfielder. He made 23 appearances for the Chile national team from 1981 to 1988. He was also part of Chile's squad for the 1983 Copa América tournament.

References

External links
 

1959 births
2015 deaths
Chilean footballers
Association football midfielders
Chile international footballers
C.D. Arturo Fernández Vial footballers
People from Talcahuano